is a female long-distance runner from Japan. She is from Hōfu City, Yamaguchi Prefecture. She competed in the Women's 10,000 metres event at the 2015 World Championships in Athletics in Beijing, China. She also competed in the Women's 10,000 metres event at the 2016 Summer Olympics in Rio de Janeiro, Brazil.

See also
 Japan at the 2015 World Championships in Athletics

References

External links

Japanese female long-distance runners
Living people
Sportspeople from Yamaguchi Prefecture
1988 births
World Athletics Championships athletes for Japan
Athletes (track and field) at the 2016 Summer Olympics
Olympic athletes of Japan
20th-century Japanese women
21st-century Japanese women